Eucalyptus olivina is a species of mallee or a tree that is endemic to Western Australia. It has smooth greyish bark, linear to narrow lance-shaped adult leaves, flower buds in groups of seven or nine, creamy white flowers and short barrel-shaped to cup-shaped fruit.

Description
It has smooth greyish bark that is shed in short strips. Flowering has been recorded in March and the flowers are creamy white.

Taxonomy and naming
Eucalyptus olivina was first formally described in 1993 by Ian Brooker and Stephen Hopper in the journal Nuytsia. The specific epithet (olivina) is said to be derived from olivinus, meaning "olive-coloured" referring to the leaves, but according to F. A. Sharr olivinus is a non-word, "presumably derived from olivaceus meaning "olive-coloured".

Distribution and habitat
This eucalypt mostly grows in deep red sand and is common and widespread in the south-eastern wheatbelt extending to east of Hyden in the Avon Wheatbelt, Coolgardie, Esperance Plains and Mallee biogeographic regions.

Conservation status
This eucalypt is classified as "not threatened" by the Western Australian Government Department of Parks and Wildlife.

See also
List of Eucalyptus species

References

Eucalypts of Western Australia
olivina
Myrtales of Australia
Plants described in 1993
Taxa named by Ian Brooker
Taxa named by Stephen Hopper